The 2021 Malaysia Super League, was the 18th season of the Malaysia Super League, the top-tier professional football league in Malaysia.

The defending champions from the 2020 Malaysia Super League season, Johor Darul Ta'zim, have managed to defend their title, securing their 8th consecutive title (since 2014) on 28 August 2021 although having 2 more matches left. On the other hand, Kedah who became the runner-ups have qualified to the 2022 AFC Cup. Penang who got third was a standby team for the AFC Cup and would qualify if the winners of the 2021 Malaysia Cup went to the Johor or Kedah, but they failed to and Kuala Lumpur City who became the champions ended up taking the spot.

Teams

Changes from last season

Team changes
Promoted from the 2020 Malaysia Premier League
 Kuala Lumpur United 
 Penang 

Relegated to the 2021 Malaysia Premier League
 Royal Malaysia Police

Disbanded Team
FELDA United

Renamed/Rebranded Clubs
 Kedah FA was renamed as Kedah Darul Aman F.C.
 F.A. Selangor was renamed as Selangor F.C. 
 Kuala Lumpur United F.C. was renamed as Kuala Lumpur City F.C.

Clubs locations

Personnel, kit and sponsoring

Coaching changes
Note: Flags indicate national team as has been defined under FIFA eligibility rules. Players may hold more than one non-FIFA nationality.

Foreign players
Southeast Asia (SEA) players are required to have acquired at least 30 international caps for their senior national team with no period restriction on when they are earned while those who has less than 30 international caps will be subjected to MFL approval.

Note: Flags indicate national team as defined under FIFA eligibility rules. Players may hold more than one FIFA and non-FIFA nationality.

 Players name in bold indicates the player is registered during the mid-season transfer window.
 Foreign players who left their clubs or were de-registered from playing squad due to medical issues or other matters.

Naturalisation players

Notes:
  Carrying Malaysian heritage.
  Participated in the Malaysia national team squad.

League table

Result table

Positions by round
The table lists the positions of teams after each week of matches.In order to preserve chronological evolvements, any postponed matches are not included to the round at which they were originally scheduled but added to the full round they were played immediately afterward.

Season statistics
First goal of the season: 34 minutes and 9 seconds 
 Safawi Rasid for Johor Darul Ta'zim against Kedah Darul Aman  (5 March 2021)

 Fastest goal in a match:  9 seconds
 Rafael Vitor for Penang against Perak (3 August 2021)

 Goal scored at the latest point in a match: 97 minutes and 59 seconds
 Jang Suk-won for Melaka United against Kuala Lumpur City (31 July 2021)

 Oldest Goalscorer in a match: 41 Years Old 7 Months 15 Days
 Shukor Adan for Kuala Lumpur City against UiTM (8 May 2021)

 Most goals scored by one player in a match: 3 goals
(All players who got a hatrick)

 Widest winning margin: 6 goals
 Selangor 6–0 Sabah (5 September 2021)

 Most goals in a match: 8 goals
 Perak 3–5 Penang (3 August 2021)

 Most goals in one half: 6 goals
 Perak vs Penang (3 August 2021) 2–4 at half time, 3–5 final

 Most goals in one half by a single team: 4 goals
 Johor Darul Ta'zim vs Perak (31 July 2021) 1–0 at half time, 5–0 final
 Penang vs Perak (3 August 2021) 4–2 at half time, 5–3 final
 Selangor vs Sabah (5 September 2021) 4–0 at half time, 6–0 final

Top goalscorers
As of matches played 12 September 2021

Hat-trick
As of matches played 12 September 2021

Notes
(H) – Home team
(A) – Away team

Top assists
As of matches played 12 September 2021

Clean Sheets

Discipline

Overall

Players
 Most yellow cards: 6
  Amirul Azhan (Perak) 
  Arif Fadzilah (Terengganu) 
  Azwan Aripin (Penang) 
  Filemon Anyie (Petaling Jaya City) 
  Kpah Sherman (Kedah Darul Aman)
  Khuzaimi Piee (UiTM)

 Most red cards: 1
  Nik Shahrul (Kuala Lumpur City)
  Fadzrul Danel (Kedah Darul Aman)
  Renan Alves (Kedah Darul Aman)
  Rodney Celvin Akwensivie (Kedah Darul Aman)
  Casagrande (Penang)
  Khairu Azrin Khazali (Penang)
  Latiff Suhaimi (Penang)
  Raffi Nagoorgani (Petaling Jaya City)
  Maxsius Musa (Sabah)
  Ezanie Salleh (Sri Pahang)
  Hérold Goulon (Sri Pahang)
  Ashmawi Yakin (Selangor)
  Sharul Nazeem (Selangor)
  Syahmi Safari (Selangor)
  Farid Nezal (UiTM)

Club
 Most red cards: 3
 Kedah Darul Aman
 Penang
 Selangor

 Most yellow cards: 4
 Sabah

See also
 2021 Malaysia Premier League
 2021 Malaysia M3 League
 2021 Malaysia M4 League
 2021 Malaysia FA Cup
 2021 Malaysia Cup
 2021 Malaysia Challenge Cup
 2021 Piala Presiden
 2021 Piala Belia

References

External links
 Football Association of Malaysia website
 Malaysian Football League website 

Malaysia Super League
Malaysia Super League seasons
1